The 1973 Swedish Rally (formally the 24th International Swedish Rally) was the second round of the inaugural World Rally Championship season.  Run in mid-February around Karlstad, Sweden, the rally was the only snow and ice rally of the WRC calendar, a distinction it would keep as it remained a fixture of the WRC through the years.  Only in 2007 would it finally be joined on the schedule by a second snow rally in Norway.

Report 
In 1973, and for several years afterward, only manufacturers were given points for finishes in WRC events.  After the Alpine A110s dominated the earlier Monte Carlo Rally, Sweden was instead taken by Swedish drivers Stig Blomqvist and Per Eklund, both driving Swedish-built Saab 96 V4 cars.  While Jean-Luc Thérier did get an Alpine onto the podium in third place, it was the only such car to finish and he was one of only two drivers not of Scandinavian nationality to complete the race.

Results 

Source: Independent WRC archive

Championship standings after the event

References

External links 
 Official website of the World Rally Championship
 1973 Swedish Rally  at Rallye-info 

Sweden
Swedish Rally
Rally
Swedish Rally